Williams Mountain may refer to:

Mountain summits
Ace Williams Mountain, Tennessee, United States
Bill Williams Mountain, Arizona, United States
Bill Williams Peak, Colorado, United States
Williams Mountain (Alaka), United States
Williams Mountain (Arkansas), United States
Williams Mountain (California), United States
Williams Mountain (Georgia), United States
Williams Mountain (Maine), United States
Williams Mountain (Missouri), United States
Williams Mountain (Montana), United States
Williams Mountain (North Carolina), United States
Williams Mountain (Oklahoma), United States
Williams Mountain (Oregon), United States

Mountain ranges
Bill Williams Mountains, Arizona, United States
Williams Fork Mountains (Grand County, Colorado), United States
Williams Fork Mountains (Moffat County, Colorado), United States
Williams Mountains, Colorado, United States

Town
Williams Mountain, West Virginia, United States

See also
Mount Williams (disambiguation)